Sincerity Is an Easy Disguise in This Business is the third full-length album released by the melodic hardcore band Evergreen Terrace. This is the last album to feature drummer Christopher Brown. The song "Brave Reality" originally appeared on the cover album Writer's Block. A music video was released for the song "New Friend Request", a first for the band.

Track listing

Personnel
Evergreen Terrace
Andrew Carey – lead vocals
Craig Chaney – lead guitar, clean vocals
Josh James – rhythm guitar, backing vocals
Jason Southwell – bass guitar
Christopher Brown – drums

Additional
Daryl Phenneger – producer, engineer
Paul Lapinski – mixing and mastering

Cultural references
The band is known for referring to pop culture in their titles, lyrics, and soundbites.

References

2005 albums
Eulogy Recordings albums
Evergreen Terrace albums